Jaime Daniel Castaño Zacarías (died 9 December 2020) was a Mexican journalist. He was assassinated on 9 December 2020.

References

Year of birth missing
2020 deaths
Assassinated Mexican journalists